St. Clair Township may refer to:

Places in Canada

 St. Clair Township, Ontario

Places in the United States

 St. Clair Township, St. Clair County, Illinois
 St. Clair Township, Benton County, Iowa
 St. Clair Township, Monona County, Iowa
 St. Clair Township, St. Clair County, Michigan
 St. Clair Township, Butler County, Ohio
 St. Clair Township, Columbiana County, Ohio
 St. Clair Township, Allegheny County, Pennsylvania, a former township
 St. Clair Township, Westmoreland County, Pennsylvania
 and also:
 East St. Clair Township, Bedford County, Pennsylvania
 Upper St. Clair Township, Allegheny County, Pennsylvania
 West St. Clair Township, Bedford County, Pennsylvania

See also 

 Sinclair Township (disambiguation)
 Saint Clair (disambiguation)

Township name disambiguation pages